The 1965 Six Hour Le Mans was an endurance race open to Sports Cars, Improved Production Touring Cars & Series Production Touring Cars. The event was staged at the Caversham circuit in Western Australia on Monday, 7 June 1965. Results were as follows:

References	

A History Of Australian Motor Sport, © 1980
Around The Houses, © 1980
Modern Motor, August 1965
Racing Car News, July 1965
www.terrywalkersplace.com

Six Hours Le Mans
Six Hours Le Mans